Milonoff is a surname that may refer to:

 Eero Milonoff (born 1980), Finnish actor
 Juho Milonoff (born 1974), Finnish actor known for his roles in films and television, e.g. Salatut elämät
 Pekka Milonoff (born 1947), Finnish theatre and film director
 Tuomas Milonoff (born 1974), Finnish television director, presenter, and producer